Shapiro, and its variations such as Shapira, Schapiro, Schapira, Sapir, Sapira, Spira, Sapiro, Spiro (name)/Spyro (in Greek), Szapiro/Szpiro (in Polish) and Chapiro (in French), is a Jewish Ashkenazi surname.

Etymology 
The surname is derived from the medieval name of Speyer, Germany, compare Spire, the French name for that city. Other name variants attributed to Speyer include Sapiro, Spira, Spire, Spiro, Spero, Chapiro, Sprai, Szpir, Szpiro, Sapir and Spear. The family name Speyer (based on the modern German name for the same city) has also become a well-known surname that was spread by Jews from Frankfurt to England, the United States and Canada in the late 19th and early 20th century. Some suggest that the surname derives from the Aramaic word meaning "handsome".

Notable people surnamed Shapiro
 Adam Shapiro (disambiguation), several people
 Alan Shapiro (b. 1952), American poet
 Alan Shapiro (education reformer), American education reformer
 Alan N. Shapiro (born 1956), American science fiction and media theorist
 Alex Shapiro, American composer
 Allen Shapiro, American investor
 Andrew H. Schapiro, American diplomat
 Anna D. Shapiro (born 1966), American theatre director
 Ari Shapiro, American reporter with National Public Radio
 Arnold Shapiro (born 1941), American television producer and writer
 Arnold S. Shapiro, American mathematician
 Arthur Shapiro, entomologist and ecologist
 Arthur K. Shapiro, psychiatrist and expert on the Tourette syndrome (1923–1995)
 Artie Shapiro (1916–2003), American jazz bassist
 Ascher H. Shapiro, MIT professor and expert in fluid dynamics (1916–2004)
 Ben Shapiro, American conservative political commentator
 Bernard Shapiro, Canadian academic, civil servant
 Beth Shapiro, evolutionary biologist
 Cal Shapiro, vocalist, Timeflies
 Carl Shapiro, (born 1955) UC Berkeley economist and mathematician
 Carl J. Shapiro (born 1913), Boston philanthropist
 Carol Harris-Shapiro, Reconstructionist rabbi
 Charles S. Shapiro, American diplomat
 Daniel B. Shapiro, U.S. ambassador to Israel
 David Shapiro (disambiguation), several people
 Dmitry Shapiro, entrepreneur, inventor, Googler
 Ehud Shapiro, Israeli computer scientist
 Florence Shapiro, American politician
 Francine Shapiro, American psychologist
 Fred R. Shapiro, American legal librarian and editor
 George Shapiro, American talent producer
 Gerald Shapiro (disambiguation), several people
 Harold S. Shapiro (1928–2021), mathematics professor
 Harold T. Shapiro, president of Princeton University
 Harvey Shapiro (disambiguation), several people
 Helen Shapiro, British singer
 Ian Shapiro, American political scientist
 Ilya Piatetski-Shapiro, mathematician (1929–2009)
 Irwin Shapiro (1911–1981), American writer and translator
 Irwin I. Shapiro, astrophysicist
 Irving Shapiro (1904–1931), one of the Shapiro Brothers, New York City labor racketeers
 Irving S. Shapiro, attorney, former CEO of Dupont
 J. David Shapiro, American filmmaker and stand-up comedian
 Jacob Shapiro, mobster
 James S. Shapiro (born 1955), American professor of English Literature 
 Jeremy J. Shapiro, professor at Fielding Graduate University.
 Jesse Shapiro, American economist
 Jim Shapiro (attorney), attorney
 Jim Shapiro (drummer), American musician, drummer of Veruca Salt
 Joel Shapiro, artist and sculptor
 Jordan Shapiro, American author and educator
 Joseph N. Shapiro (1887—1961), urologist, one of the founders of the urologic oncology in Russia
 Josh Shapiro, American politician and lawyer
 Jonathan Shapiro, South African political cartoonist
 Judith Shapiro, former president of Barnard College
 Judy Shapiro-Ikenberry (born 1942), American long-distance runner
 Justine Shapiro, Documentary Filmmaker and Globe Trekker host
 Karl Shapiro, United States poet
 Laurie Gwen Shapiro, American novelist and filmmaker
 Lee Shapiro, American film maker, killed by the Soviet military in Afghanistan
 Les Shapiro (1956–2022), American sports announcer
 Linda Hopkins Shapiro, better known as Tera Patrick, former American pornographic actress
 Lisa Shapiro (born 1967), American and Canadian philosopher
 Louis Shapiro (communist), American Communist Party organizer
 Louis Shapiro, Connecticut Supreme Court justice
 Marc B. Shapiro, professor of Judaic Studies at University of Scranton
 Mark Shapiro (disambiguation), several people
 Marla Shapiro, Canadian medical doctor, author and health journalist (print, television)
 Meir Shapiro, Orthodox rabbi
 Mendel Shapiro, Modern Orthodox rabbi
 Meyer Shapiro (1908–1931), one of the Shapiro Brothers, New York City labor racketeers
 Michael Shapiro (disambiguation), several people
 Mordechai Shapiro, American singer
 Nat Mayer Shapiro, American visual artist
 Neal Shapiro, president of PBS station Thirteen/WNET New York City.
 Neal Shapiro (equestrian) (born 1945), American equestrian and Olympic medalist
 Nevin Shapiro (born 1969), convicted American fraudster and central figure in the 2011 University of Miami athletics scandal
  Nina Gordon Shapiro, American singer
 Norma Levy Shapiro, United States federal judge
 Norman Shapiro (1932–2021), American mathematician and computer scientist
 Paul Shapiro (disambiguation), several people
 Peter Shapiro (disambiguation), several people
 Ralph Shapiro (1908–1974), New York politician
 Rashi Shapiro, Orthodox rabbi at Loch Sheldrake Synagogue, Jewish folk-rock musician, psychologist
 Refael Shapiro, Orthodox rabbi
 Rick Shapiro, comedian and actor
 Robert Shapiro (disambiguation), several people
 Robert Schapire, computer scientist who co-invented AdaBoost, a widely used machine learning meta-algorithm.
 Roy D. Shapiro, Professor of Business Administration at the Harvard Business School
 Samantha Shapiro (born 1993), American gymnast
 Samantha Harris Shapiro, American TV host (Dancing with the Stars, Entertainment Tonight)
 Samuel Shapiro (disambiguation), several people
 Saul Shapiro, president of the Metropolitan Television Alliance, LLC (MTVA)
 Scott Shapiro, American political philosopher
 Seymour Shapiro, American chemist who pioneered development of pharmaceuticals for use against diabetes
 Sharon Shapiro, American gymnast
 Shmuel Shapiro (born 1974), French Chassidic-Jewish singer and Hazan.
 Sidney Shapiro, Chinese author and translator of American descent
 Stanley J. Shapiro, professor Emeritus of Marketing at Simon Fraser University
 Steve Shapiro, American music producer
 Stewart Shapiro, philosopher and logician
 Stuart Loren Shapiro, better known as Todd Loren (1960–1992), American publisher
 Stuart S. Shapiro, producer, writer, director, and Internet entrepreneur
 Sumner Shapiro, U.S. Navy Rear Admiral and former director of the Office of Naval Intelligence
 Susan Shapiro, American author and educator
 Ted Shapiro (1899–1980), U.S. popular music composer, pianist, and sheet music publisher
 Theodore Shapiro (psychiatrist), psychiatrist and psychoanalyst in New York
 Theodore Shapiro (composer), American composer
 Todd Shapiro, Canadian radio show host
 Victor L. Shapiro (1924–2013), American mathematician
 Walter Shapiro, American journalist and columnist 
 William "Willie" Shapiro (1911–1934), one of the Shapiro Brothers, New York City labor racketeers

Other uses
 "Miss Shapiro", a song by 801 from the album 801 Live

See also
 Mikhail Chapiro, artist and painter, emigrated from Russia to Canada
 Schapiro
 Shapeero
 Shapero
 Shapira
 Spero
 Spira (family name)

References

Jewish surnames
Surnames
Yiddish-language surnames

he:שפירא